Nayef is both a given name and a surname. Notable people with the name include:

Given name
 Nayef Aguerd (born 1996), Moroccan football player
 Nayef Hawatmeh, founder of the Democratic Front for the Liberation of Palestine
 Nayef Mubarak Al Khater, Qatari football player
 Nayef Rajoub, Palestinian politician
 Nayef bin Abdulaziz Al Saud (1933–2012), Saudi royal
 Nayef bin Ahmed Al Saud (born 1965), Saudi royal and security officer

Surname
 Prince Asem bin Al Nayef, Jordanian prince
 Badr Salem Nayef, Qatari weightlifter
 Talal Nayef, Kuwaiti footballer

References